Margaret Nyagahura was a senator in the parliament of Rwanda. Nyagahura was appointed by Paul Kagame.

References

Members of the Senate (Rwanda)
21st-century Rwandan women politicians
21st-century Rwandan politicians
Living people
Year of birth missing (living people)